is a railway station in the city of Shimoda, Shizuoka Prefecture, Japan, operated by the privately owned Izu Kyūkō Line .

Lines

Station layout
The station has a single elevated island platform serving two tracks, and the station building is underneath the platforms and tracks. The station is staffed

Platforms

Adjacent stations

History 
Rendaiji Station was opened on December 10, 1961.

Passenger statistics
In fiscal 2017, the station was used by an average of 386 passengers daily (boarding passengers only).

Surrounding area
Inosawa Elementary School
Inosawa Middle School
Rendaiji onsen

See also
 List of Railway Stations in Japan

References

External links

 official home page.

Railway stations in Shizuoka Prefecture
Izu Kyūkō Line
Railway stations in Japan opened in 1961
Stations of Izu Kyūkō
Shimoda, Shizuoka